Catasauqua station was a Lehigh Valley Railroad station in Catasauqua, Pennsylvania. It was located on the Lehigh Valley main line.

Lehigh Valley service to Catasauqua began on July 4, 1855, roughly a month after the company opened its original line between Allentown and Easton, Pennsylvania. As was common for that era, it used a locally-constructed building. The company completed more permanent passenger and freight houses in 1861. One historian characterized the buildings in Catasauqua in the late nineteenth century as "rag-tag"; a state of affairs which came to end when a runaway railway car damaged the buildings in 1904.

The new brick passenger station in Catasauqua was constructed in 1905–1906. Amenities included a waiting room, agent's room, and a baggage room. Economic hardship led to the station's closure on June 30, 1933. Some local trains continued to stop there into the late 1930s. The station building was demolished in 1941.

Notes

References

External links 
 

Former Lehigh Valley Railroad stations
Demolished railway stations in the United States
Railway stations in the United States opened in 1855
Railway stations closed in 1933